The battle of Thetford occurred in 1004. Sigvat records the victory of King Ethelred, allied with Olaf Haraldsson, over the Danes under Sweyn Forkbeard during the latter's campaigns in England.

The battle site was located in lands under the control of Ulfcytel Snillingr, then of East Anglia, at a site once thought to be near Wretham, but now thought to be at Rymer in Suffolk. The Anglo-Saxon Chronicle reports that the battle of Thetford occurred after an attempt by Ulfcytel and the "councillors in East Anglia" to negotiate a truce with Sweyn in return for a financial settlement; the Danes broke the truce, and marched on Thetford where they were met and engaged by a contingent of the East Anglian fyrd.

References 

1004 in England
Thetford
Thetford
Thetford